The Ukrainian National Revival took place during a period when the territory of modern Ukraine was divided between the Austrian Empire, the Kingdom of Hungary and the Russian Empire after the partitions of Poland at the end of the 18th century. The period took place soon after the Haidamaka Uprisings (also known as Koliivshchyna) rocked lands of former Cossack Hetmanate.

The movement arose at a time when the Ukrainian national resistance was almost entirely subjugated and largely driven underground. All state institutions under the Cossack Hetmanate were completely liquidated along with the Cossack movement. The European territory of the Russian Empire had successfully crossed the Dnieper and extended towards Central Europe, as well as reaching the shores of Black Sea.

Nonetheless, the period is also considered to be the beginning of modern Ukrainian literature, foremostly the works of Ivan Kotliarevsky. A number of Ukrainian historians such as Volodymyr Doroshenko and Mykhailo Hrushevsky divided the period into three stages. The first stage stretches from the end of the 18th century to the 1840s, the second stage covers the period of the 1840s-1850s, and the third stage is the second half of the 19th century.

Novhorod-Siversky Patriotic Circle
Novhorod-Siversky Patriotic Circle existed prior to the Patriotic war of 1812 in Novhorod-Siverskyi, Russian Empire. Its members included such personalities like Andriy Hudovych, Tymofiy Kalynsky, Ivan Khalansky, Arkhyp Khudorba, Pavlo Koropchevsky, Opanas Lobysevych (one of the leaders), Mykhailo Myklashevsky, Hryhoriy Poletyka, Andriy Rachynsky, Bishop Verlaam Shyshatsky, Fedir Tumansky, Melkhysedek Znachko-Yavorsky, H. Dolynsky, S. Shyrai, and A. Pryhara. There are speculations that the 1791 secret mission of Vasily Kapnist to Berlin was connected with that circle. The circle played a key role in revival of Cossack regiments (see Ivan Kotliarevsky).

Sts Cyril and Methodius Brotherhood

Brotherhood of Sts Cyril and Methodius was a short-lasting underground anti-absolutist organization of Russian Empire based in Kyiv and consisting of 12 members. Ideas of Pan-Slavism were popular among some of its participants. It was led by Mykola Kostomarov.

Hromada

A network of hromadas (Ukrainian communities) appeared soon after the liquidation of the Sts Cyril and Methodius Brotherhood and was heavily influenced by the ongoing Khlopomanstvo movement on the territory of modern Ukraine. The first such hromada appeared in the capital of Russian Empire, Saint Petersburg. Many members were editors of the Ukrainian magazine Osnova that was published in 1861–62. Among the later members of the Saint Peterburg Hromada were Volodymyr Leontovych, Petro Stebnytsky and others. The most influential hromada, however, appeared in Kyiv, members of which were Volodymyr Antonovych, Mykhailo Drahomanov, Mykola Lysenko, Pavlo Chubynsky, and many others. Alternatively called the Old Hromada, Hromada of Kyiv played a key role in appearance of numerous Ukrainian political and cultural organizations in the Ukrainian guberniyas of the Russian Empire such as the Society of Ukrainian Progressionists, Revolutionary Ukrainian Party, Prosvita (Enlightment), and others. Some powerful hromadas existed in Odesa, Kharkiv, Chernihiv, Poltava and elsewhere.

In the Austrian Empire and the Kingdom of Hungary

The Ukrainian national revival in the territory what is today Western Ukraine is considered to have started around 1837, when Markiyan Shashkevych, Ivan Vahylevych and Yakiv Holovatsky published Rusalka Dnistrovaya, an almanac of Ukrainian folk songs in Buda, Hungary. During the Revolution of 1848, the Supreme Ruthenian Council was founded in Lviv, becoming the first legal Ukrainian political organization. In May 1848, Zoria Halytska started publishing as the first newspaper in Ukrainian language. In 1890, Ukrainian Radical Party, the first Ukrainian political party, was founded.

See also
Ukrainian nationalism

References

External links
 Doroshenko, V. Ukrainian culture in Russia. Newer times. "Circulation of the Union for liberation of Ukraine". Vienna, 1917.
 Hrytsak, Ya. Outline of the History of Ukraine: Formation of the Ukrainian modern nation.
 Ukrainian Liberation Movement. Electronic archives
 Novhorod-Siverskyi patriotic circle in the Encyclopedia of Ukraine
 Hromadas (Hromada of Kyiv) in the Encyclopedia of Ukraine

Neo-romanticism
Populism
History of Ukraine (1795–1918)
Ukrainian culture
Russian Empire
Ukrainian nationalism